Herman Richard Salmon (July 11, 1913 – June 22, 1980), nicknamed "Fish", was a barnstormer, air racer, and test pilot for the Lockheed Corporation.

Biography

Early life
Salmon was born in 1913 in Milwaukee, Wisconsin, to Pennsylvania-born engineer Harry Britton Salmon and his wife Bertha Wilhelmine née Wagner. His first flight in an aircraft was at the age of 14; by 18 he was a licensed pilot. During the 1930s he flew as a barnstormer, parachute stuntman and race pilot. By 1940 he was living in Los Angeles, California with his first wife Evelyn.

Lockheed
He started work at Lockheed in 1940 ferrying Hudsons to Montreal for the Royal Air Force. In 1945, he was transferred to the engineering test piloting division by Tony LeVier, who was the new head of the department.

As engineering test pilot, he spin tested the P-38 Lightning and dive tested the P-80 Shooting Star, the XF-90 penetration fighter prototype, and the F-94C Starfire. He certification tested two of the models of the Constellation for the Civil Aeronautics Administration. He made the first flights of such aircraft as the L-188 Electra, P-3 Orion, YF-104A Starfighter, and the XFV-1 tailsitter, which was named in his honor. He succeeded Tony LeVier as chief engineering test pilot, until he retired from Lockheed in 1978.

The Goodyear Trophy air races, 1947-1949
A new class of air racing was introduced at the 1947 National Air Races in Cleveland, Ohio, sponsored for three years by the Goodyear corporation. The first year Herman achieved a third place flying a Cosmic Wind plane with a speed of 158.8 mph (256 km/h). The Cosmic Wind was designed and built by a group of Lockheed employees, including Tony LeVier. In 1948 Herman finished first, and in 1949 fifth.

Later years
In 1968, Salmon was the recipient of the coveted Kitty Hawk Memorial Award for distinguished achievement as a test pilot.

Salmon continued to teach flight crew and ferry aircraft. In 1974 he flew as a passenger on the maiden flight of the then-recently restored Westland Lysander piloted and owned by Dwight Brooks.

In 1980, he was killed in Lockheed L-1049H Super Constellation N74CA that he was ferrying to Alaska, when it crashed on take off from Bakalar municipal airport in Columbus, Indiana. Also killed in the crash were flight engineer Leland J. Sanders and a passenger. Five others survived the crash including Salmon's son and copilot, Randall.

Herman Salmon had logged about 17,250 flight hours.

In 1994, he was inducted into the Aerospace Walk of Honor.

Herman R. Salmon Technical Publications Award
Since 1971 the Society of Experimental Test Pilots, of which Salmon was a Fellow, has made an annual award "to recognize the most outstanding technical paper published in Cockpit magazine". The selection criteria include:
 Contribution to flight testing
 Contribution to the exchange of information between test pilots that would not otherwise be generally available.

See also
 Herman
 Herman R. Salmon Technical Publications Award
 List of accidents and incidents involving the Lockheed Constellation
 List of aviators by nickname
 Salmon (surname)

References 

 LeVier, Tony, with John Guenther, Pilot. 1954 (reprinted 1990).
 Pace, Steve, Lockheed Skunk Works. Motorbooks: Osceola WI, 1992.

External links 
 : a documentary on Salmon
 Biography from Wisconsin Aviation Hall of Fame
 City of Lancaster, Aerospace Walk of Honor, 1994 Honorees 

1913 births
1980 deaths
American test pilots
Aviators killed in aviation accidents or incidents in the United States
Lockheed people
Victims of aviation accidents or incidents in 1980